Jamie Lee Rattray (born September 30, 1992) is a Canadian women's ice hockey player for the Markham Thunder.

Life 
As a member of the gold medal-winning squad at the 2010 IIHF World Women's U18 Championship, a hockey card of her was featured in the Upper Deck 2010 World of Sports card series.

While in college, she played for the Clarkson Golden Knights. In 2014, she won the Patty Kazmaier Award and helped Clarkson win their first NCAA women's hockey championship. She was selected sixth overall by the Brampton Thunder in the 2014 CWHL Draft. She made her debut with the Canada women's national ice hockey team at the 2014 4 Nations Cup. Rattray outed herself as lesbian.

Playing career
Rattray is of Aboriginal heritage and participated at the 2010 National Aboriginal Hockey Championships in Ottawa, Ontario, from May 2–8, 2010.

NCAA
Rattray joined the Clarkson Golden Knights in 2010. She was also recruited by Minnesota, Minnesota–Duluth, St. Lawrence, Wisconsin, Mercyhurst and Cornell. At Clarkson, Rattray was a standout player, eventually becoming the all-time leading scorer for the program with 181 points, winning the 2014 Patty Kazmaier Award, and helping lead Clarkson to the national championship in 2014.

Hockey Canada
In April 2010, Rattray was part of the Canadian Under-18 squad that captured gold at the IIHF Under-18 World Championships. To celebrate the gold medal win, she participated in the Canada Celebrates Event on June 30 in Edmonton, Alberta, which recognized the Canadian Olympic and World hockey champions from the 2009–10 season . Rattray was the top scorer (3 goals, 3 assists, 6 points) for Canada at the 2012 Meco Cup.

On January 11, 2022, Rattay was named to Canada's 2022 Olympic team.

CWHL
In the third period of an 8–0 win on January 18, 2015, for the Boston Blades over the Brampton Thunder, and a fight took place. Boston's Monique Lamoureux and Rattray both threw punches, as video footage went viral online. Rattray won the Jayna Hefford Trophy as the most valuable player in the CWHL, as named by the players for the 2017–18 season.

Ball hockey
Rattray was also a member of the Canada women's national ball hockey team that competed at the 2017 Ball Hockey World Championship in Pardubice, Czech Republic. She would emerge with a bronze medal while capturing the tournament-scoring title.

Career stats

Hockey Canada

NCAA

CWHL

Awards and honours
2007–2008 Earl of March Secondary School Junior Female Athlete of the Year
2008–2009 Earl of March Senior Female Athlete of the Year
2009–2010 Earl of March Outstanding Senior Female Athlete

NCAA
2011–2012 Ron Frazier Award 
2012 Patty Kazmaier Award nominee
2010–2011 Clarkson University Female Rookie of the Year
2014 Patty Kazmaier Award
2014 ECAC Hockey Player of the Year Award
2014 ECAC Hockey First-Team Selection
2013–14 NCAA scoring champion
2014 NCAA Champion with Clarkson Golden Knights
ECAC Player of the Month (Month of October 2011)
ECAC Player of the Week (Week of October 25, 2012)
ECAC Player of the week (Week of November 18, 2013)
ECAC Player of the Month (November 2013)

CWHL
2018 Clarkson Cup Champion (Markham Thunder)
2018 Jayna Hefford Trophy (Markham Thunder)
2016–17 CWHL All-Star (Brampton Thunder)
2015–16 CWHL All-Star (Brampton Thunder)
2014–15 CWHL All-Star (Brampton Thunder)

Ball hockey
2015 CBHA Nationals, Most Valuable Forward
2015 CBHA Nationals, Top Scorer
2017 ISBHF World Championships, Leading Scorer

References

External links

1992 births
Living people
Brampton Thunder players
Canadian expatriate ice hockey players in the United States
Canadian women's ice hockey forwards
Clarkson Cup champions
Clarkson Golden Knights women's ice hockey players
First Nations sportspeople
Ice hockey people from Ottawa
Markham Thunder players
Patty Kazmaier Award winners
Ice hockey players at the 2022 Winter Olympics
Medalists at the 2022 Winter Olympics
Olympic gold medalists for Canada
Olympic medalists in ice hockey
Olympic ice hockey players of Canada
Canadian LGBT sportspeople
Lesbian sportswomen
LGBT ice hockey players